Minushahr (also Romanized as Mīnūshahr) is a city and capital of Minu District, in Khorramshahr County, Khuzestan Province, Iran. At the 2006 census, its population was 1,210, in 249 families.

Minushahr is located on Minu Island.

References

Populated places in Khorramshahr County

Cities in Khuzestan Province